PGW may refer to: 

 Painted Grey Ware culture (1100 BC to 350 BC), an Iron Age archaeological culture of ancient India
 Philadelphia Gas Works, a natural gas utility owned by and serving Philadelphia, Pennsylvania, U. S.
 PDN Gateway, a gateway used in LTE/4G networks
 Publishers Group West, a book distributor based in Berkeley, California
 Paris Games Week, an annual trade fair for video games held in Paris, France
 Persian Gulf War
 Pressure Groundwood, Method to manufacture Mechanical Pulp. Created by Oy Tampella Ab